Daniel S. Hendrickson  is the 25th president of Creighton University starting on July 1, 2015, until the present. He was previously the Associate Provost for Academic Initiatives at Marquette University.

Biography

Early life
Daniel S. Hendrickson is a native of Fremont, Nebraska, and graduated from Mount Michael Benedictine High School in Elkhorn, Nebraska. He comes from a family of educators.  Daniel's identical twin is D. Scott Hendrickson, SJ, a Loyola University Chicago assistant professor of modern languages. Daniel's older brother Ryan Hendrickson is a political science professor and interim dean of Eastern Illinois University Graduate School.

Education
Hendrickson graduated from Marquette in 1993 with a bachelor's degree in psychology and theology. Hendrickson holds three master's degrees: from Fordham University a MA in philosophical resources, from Jesuit School of Theology at Santa Clara University a Master of Divinity, and a MA from Columbia University.

Holding a doctorate in the Philosophy of Education from Columbia's Teachers College he wrote his dissertation, The Jesuit Imaginary: Higher Education in a Secular Age, on the work of the Canadian philosopher Charles Taylor and the Renaissance humanist elements of education in the Jesuit tradition.

Career
Hendrickson entered the Jesuits in 1994. He was ordained a Catholic priest of the Society of Jesus in 2006.

Hendrickson returned to Marquette University in 2012 as the Associate Vice President in the Office of the Executive Vice President, and then in 2014 became an Associate Provost for Academic Initiatives.  Although never having served as a university president before, Hendrickson is confident in his ability to lead. At Marquette, in his role in the provost’s office, he also co-directed a service leadership scholarship program, oversaw an enrollment growth initiative and managed expansion of the Title IX compliance office.

President of Creighton University
Hendrickson became the 25th president of Creighton University, a Jesuit, Catholic university in Omaha, Nebraska, on July 1, 2015. Hendrickson's predecessor, Timothy R. Lannon retired in January 2015, with J. Christopher Bradberry, Dean of the School of Pharmacy and Health Professions, named as interim president, until Hendrickson’s arrival in July 2015.  He presided at his first public Mass as president on the Solemnity of St. Ignatius of Loyola, founder of the Society of Jesus, July 31, 2015 at St. John's Parish (Omaha, Nebraska).

Hendrickson has been affiliated with Creighton University since he was in the Jesuit Humanities Program in 1996.  From 2000-2003, Hendrickson returned as an adjunct philosophy instructor and briefly served as an adjunct professor with Creighton’s Institute for Latin American Concern (ILAC) program in Santiago, Dominican Republic for a year. Elected to the Creighton University Board of Trustees in 2013 he also serves on the boards of Boston College and Xavier University.

Inauguration 
The inauguration events for the 25th President, Hendrickson, took place on Thursday, October 1, 2015 and Friday, October 2, 2015.  The Missioning Mass began the festivities of the inauguration.  The principal celebrant for the Missioning Mass was the Very Rev. Thomas A. Lawler, S.J., Provincial of the Wisconsin Province of the Society of Jesus.  Those in attendance included retired Abbot Raphael Walsh and Abbot Theodore Wolff of Mount Michael Benedictine Abbey, the Most Rev. William Dendinger, and the two Jesuit Provincials of the Midwest USA province of the Society of Jesus, the Very Rev. Brian Paulson, S.J., (Chicago-Detroit Provincial) and the Very Rev. Thomas A. Lawler, S.J., (Wisconsin Provincial).  (These two provinces will merge in the summer of 2017 to form the Midwest USA Province of the Society of Jesus.)  Liturgy Coordinator for the Missioning Mass was Keith Kozak. The Inauguration took place on Friday, October 2, 2015, with various dignitaries and honored guests, including the Most Rev. George Lucas, Archbishop of Omaha.

Creighton Global Initiative 
Hendrickson has a special interest in education with a global perspective. His international travel and immersion experiences have taken him to over 30 countries on nearly every continent.  A Distinct Presidential Initiative was created in 2016 almost immediately after taking office.  A priority of Hendrickson's presidency is the Creighton Global Initiative.  Although Creighton already has a firm foundation of various programs in the global and education communities, there is a desire through this initiative that Creighton will build upon current academic and institutional efforts and creatively envision and implement new ones.

Creighton Global Initiative (CGI) will strengthen existing Creighton projects and programs, increase support for and build up the Global Engagement Office (GEO), and CGI will create a funding pool, housed at the GEO, to which the Creighton community may apply for financial and departmental support.

References

20th-century American Jesuits
21st-century American Jesuits
Living people
Presidents of Creighton University
Marquette University faculty
1970 births